Kyle Good (born 10 December 1991) is an Ireland men's field hockey international. He was a member of the Ireland team that won the bronze medal at the 2015 Men's EuroHockey Nations Championship.  He also represented Ireland at the 2016 Summer Olympics. At club level he has won Men's Irish Hockey League titles, the Irish Senior Cup and the EuroHockey Club Trophy with Monkstown. He also played for three clubs – Three Rock Rovers, KHC Dragons and Monkstown – in the Euro Hockey League.

Early years, family and education
Good received his early education at Rathmichael Parish National School. Between 2003 and 2010 he attended Wesley College where, in addition to field hockey, he also played rugby union and cricket and participated in track and field athletics. Between 2011 and 2014 he attended the Dublin Institute of Technology where he gained a Bachelor's degree in Human Resources and Personnel Administration.

Domestic teams

Wesley College
In the 2007 Leinster Schoolboys' Senior Cup final, Good scored the opening goal as Wesley College defeated St. Andrew's College
3–2 after extra-time. Good was also a member of the Wesley College team that won the 2009 cup final. In 2008 Good played for Wesley College in the All Ireland Schoolboys Hockey Championship final, losing 2–1 to a St. Andrew's College team featuring Stuart Loughrey. Good captained Wesley College when they won the 2009 championship, defeating Wallace High School, Lisburn 3–2 in the final.

Three Rock Rovers
While still a student at Wesley College, Good also played for  Three Rock Rovers. Together with Michael Darling he was a member of the Rovers team that won the 2008 All-Ireland Club Championship and played in the 2008–09 Euro Hockey League. In 2009, while playing for Three Rock Rovers, Good was named the ESB Under-18 Player of the Year. He was presented with the award by Stephen Martin.

Monkstown
In 2010 Good began playing for Monkstown. He subsequently helped Monkstown win the Men's Irish Hockey League title in both 2012–13 and 2013–14. Together with Graham Shaw and Peter Caruth, Good was also a member of the Monkstown team that won the 2014 EuroHockey Club Trophy. He also played for Monkstown in the 2015–16 Euro Hockey League. Good was a member of the Monkstown team that won the 2015–16 Irish Senior Cup. In 2017 he played for Monkstown in the EY Champions Trophy final, losing to his former team Three Rock Rovers. During 2017–18 Good took a break from playing field hockey.

DIT
While playing for Monkstown, Goode also represented Dublin Institute of Technology at intervarsity level. In 2012 he was a member of the first DIT team to play in the Mauritius Cup. In the 2013 Mauritius Cup final Good was a member of the DIT team that lost 3–2 to 
UCD.

KHC Dragons
During the 2014–15 season Good played for KHC Dragons in the Men's Belgian Hockey League. He teammates at Dragons included fellow Ireland international, Shane O'Donoghue. He helped Dragons win the league title  and played for them in the 2014–15 Euro Hockey League.

Spencer
Since October 2017 Good has worked for DocuSign. In November 2018 his employment saw him move to London. During the 2018–19 season he played for Spencer Hockey Club in the South League.

Ireland international
Good made his senior debut for Ireland in June 2011 in a 7–1 Celtic Cup win against France. He had previously played for Ireland at under-18 level.
Good was a member of the Ireland team that won the bronze medal at the 2015 Men's EuroHockey Nations Championship. He also represented Ireland at the 2016 Summer Olympics.

Honours
Monkstown
EuroHockey Club Trophy
Winners: 2014: 1
Men's Irish Hockey League
Winners: 2012–13, 2013–14: 2
Irish Senior Cup
Winners: 2015–16: 1
EY Champions Trophy
Runners Up: 2017: 1
KHC Dragons
Men's Belgian Hockey League
Winners: 2014–15: 1
DIT
Mauritius Cup
Runners up: 2013
Three Rock Rovers
All-Ireland Club Championship
Winners: 2008: 1 
Wesley College
All Ireland Schoolboys Hockey Championship
Winners: 2009
Runners up: 2008
Leinster Schoolboys Senior Cup
Winners: 2007, 2009: 2

References

1991 births
Living people
Irish male field hockey players
Ireland international men's field hockey players
Olympic field hockey players of Ireland
Field hockey players at the 2016 Summer Olympics
Men's Irish Hockey League players
Three Rock Rovers Hockey Club players
Monkstown Hockey Club players
KHC Dragons players
Field hockey players from County Dublin
Male field hockey midfielders
Male field hockey forwards
Expatriate field hockey players
Irish expatriate sportspeople in Belgium
Irish expatriate sportspeople in England
People educated at Wesley College, Dublin
Alumni of Dublin Institute of Technology
Men's Belgian Hockey League players